Kiunga Rural LLG is a local-level government area situated in North Fly District of Western Province of Papua New Guinea. In the year 2000, the LLG had a population of 13,249 people. The township of Kiunga is within the boundaries of this LLG, but has its own urban LLG.

The Kiunga genus of fish is named after the LLG and town of Kiunga.

Wards
01. Briompinai
02. Timindemasok
03. Atkamba
04. Dome
05. Gi
06. Gre
07. Griengas
08. Drindamasuk
09. Drimgas
10. Gasuke
11. Gusiore
12. Timingondok
13. Drimskai
14. Timinsiriap
15. Kukujaba
16. Membok
17. Erekta
18. Moian
19. Komokpin
20. Menemsore
21. Miasomnai
22. Tiomnai
23. Konkonda
24. Yulawas
25. Diabi
26. Dabike
27. Ieran
28. Iogi
29. Ralengre
30. Tamifen
31. Refugee Settlement

References

Local-level governments of Western Province (Papua New Guinea)